The Wolf That House Built is the debut album of Little Axe, released in 1994 by Wired Recordings. The album was re-issued as a digital download in 2014 featuring additional tracks.

Accolades

Track listing

Personnel 

Musicians
Saz Bell – vocals
Kevin Gibbs – vocals
Keith LeBlanc – drums
Skip McDonald – vocals, guitar, keyboards, bass guitar, programming, producer
Talvin Singh – tabla, percussion
Doug Wimbish – bass guitar

Technical personnel
Paul Beckett – engineering
Alan Branch – engineering
Dave Pine – engineering
Adrian Sherwood – producer
Frédéric Voisin – illustrations

Release history

References

External links 
 

1994 debut albums
Little Axe albums
Albums produced by Adrian Sherwood